Osvaldo Bagnoli (born 3 July 1935) is an Italian former football coach and player who played as a midfielder.

Playing career
Born in the Bovisa district of Milan, Bagnoli began his professional career as a midfielder with his hometown club A.C. Milan in 1955. Although he struggled to break into the starting line-up, due to the presence of several talented players in the first team, he was able to make his top flight debut with the club in his first season and subsequently won both the Serie A title and the Latin Cup during the 1956–57 season. He later joined Verona in 1957, where he became an important figure with the club. In his first season he scored 3 goals in 23 appearances, although he was unable to prevent the club's relegation to Serie B. In the following three seasons however, he excelled, scoring 25 goals in 74 appearances in Serie B. He later had two separate season long spells with Udinese, which were separated by two three seasons stints at Catanzaro and SPAL respectively. He ended his career in 1973, with Serie C side Verbania.

Managerial career
During his long and illustrious coaching career, Bagnoli is best remembered for being the manager which led an underdog Verona side to its first (and so far the only) Serie A title during the 1984–85 season; Bagnoli was in charge of a team which featured several promising players who had been unable to fulfil their potential until then, such as Pietro Fanna, Roberto Tricella, and Antonio Di Gennaro, but who later played a key role in the club's league title success as they matured. Bagnoli was the club's head coach from 1981 until 1990; in addition to winning the league title in 1985, during his time with the club, he helped Verona obtain promotion to Serie A in his first season, winning the 1981–82 Serie B title, and the following season, he led Verona to a fourth-place finish in the league and the Coppa Italia final, qualifying for the UEFA Cup. He left the club after they were relegated to Serie B once again at the end of the 1989–90 season.

Prior to coaching Verona, Bagnoli also managed Solbiatese, Como, Rimini, and Fano, helping the latter side to obtain promotion to Serie C1 during the 1978–79 season after capturing the Serie C2 title.

He later also coached a number of other Serie A teams throughout his career, including Genoa and Inter Milan: in the 1990–91 season, Bagnoli took Genoa to fourth place in the final league standings in his first year in charge; it was the team's best finishing position in the top Italian division for more than 50 years. The following season, he helped Genoa to the UEFA Cup semifinals, only to lose out to the eventual champions Ajax. He later helped Inter to a second-place finish in the league during the 1992–93 season; Bagnoli's second season at the club was less successful, however, and Inter's poor results in the league eventually led to his dismissal, after which he retired.

After retirement
On 20 January 2018, Bagnoli was named Hellas Verona's honorary president.

Style of play
Bagnoli was a versatile midfielder who was capable of playing in several roles, and throughout his career he was deployed as a central midfielder, as an attacking midfielder, as a right winger, and even as a defensive midfielder. His main traits were his good technique, tactical intelligence, ball-winning abilities, and eye for goal from midfield, courtesy of his powerful striking ability from distance. In his final seasons with Verbania, he was also deployed as a sweeper.

Style of management
A meticulous and tactically intelligent coach, Bagnoli usually applied the catenaccio system with his teams – in particular during his time at Verona – although he also employed zona mista tactics when defending, a cross between the man-marking and zonal marking systems; his defenders were usually required to contain their opponents in positions further away from the goal. His midfielders were often asked to press their opponents aggressively off the ball, while when in possession, he either asked his players to slow down the play and keep the ball, or hit his opponents quickly and suddenly on the counter-attack, making use of long balls out to his wingers and full-backs in order to stretch his opponents and create space for the forwards. He usually employed a sweeper in his teams, who was also required either to play or carry the ball out from the back after winning back possession and function as a deep-lying playmaker until his teammates were back in position; he also used an advanced playmaker behind the team's two forwards, who was in charge of implementing the side's set plays with his quick passing, as well as playing balls out to the wingers or attacking full-backs, or creating chances for the strikers. At Verona, Pietro Fanna was also required to play an important role on the wing under Bagnoli, who utilised the winger's technical skills, speed, and intelligent movement to help the team push forward quickly on the break; in this role, Fanna was also known for his ability to hold up the ball in order to create space for teammates and full-backs making overlapping attacking runs, functioning as a playmaker himself on the flank at times. Bagnoli usually attempted to field his players in a system which best suited their technical and tactical characteristics, and often felt that they should be given the freedom to express their individual skills in their most appropriate position. Furthermore, he preferred to work with a small group of players for his starting eleven, avoiding turnovers as much as possible. In spite of his friendly and reserved character, and reputation as a man of few words, he was known to be an excellent motivator and communicated well with his players, often looking to collaborate with them in implementing his ideas. Usually his teams were known for starting off slowly and then finishing seasons strongly, after Bagnoli was able to perfect his systems throughout the season through gradual modifications. Regarding Bagnoli, Italy's 1982 World Cup-winning manager Enzo Bearzot commented that he saw his own system in Verona's formation. Bagnoli's success with Verona later earned him the nickname "il mago della Bovisa" (the wizard from Bovisa).

Honours

Player 
Milan
 Serie A: 1956–57
 Latin Cup: 1956

Manager 
Fano
 Serie C2: 1978–79

Hellas Verona
 Serie A: 1984–85
 Serie B: 1981–82

Individual 
 Seminatore d'oro: 1984
 Italian Football Hall of Fame: 2017

References 

Living people
1935 births
Italian footballers
Footballers from Milan
Association football midfielders
Serie A players
Serie B players
A.C. Milan players
Hellas Verona F.C. players
Udinese Calcio players
U.S. Catanzaro 1929 players
S.P.A.L. players
S.S. Verbania Calcio players
Italian football managers
Serie A managers
A.S.D. SolbiaSommese Calcio managers
Como 1907 managers
Rimini F.C. 1912 managers
Alma Juventus Fano 1906 managers
A.C. Cesena managers
Hellas Verona F.C. managers
Genoa C.F.C. managers
Inter Milan managers